Brent Sexton (born August 12, 1967) is an American actor best known for his roles in the television series Bosch, The Killing, Life, and Deadwood. He has guest starred in several other television series, such as The Expanse, Justified, That's Life, Birds of Prey, Law & Order: Special Victims Unit, and Judging Amy. He has also appeared in several motion pictures, such as In the Valley of Elah, Flightplan, Radio, and A.I. Artificial Intelligence.

In 2006, Sexton, along with the cast of Deadwood, was nominated for a Screen Actors Guild Award.

Early life
Sexton was born in St. Louis, Missouri. He studied at Missouri State University and Elon University.

Career
Sexton toured internationally with a theater company as both Officer Krupke and Detective Schrank in West Side Story.

Filmography

References

External links

1967 births
American male film actors
American male stage actors
American male television actors
Elon University alumni
Living people
Male actors from St. Louis
20th-century American male actors
21st-century American male actors